Hamburger Börs was an Art Nouveau hotel building in Turku, Finland, next to the Market Square built in 1909. It was designed by Frithiof Strandell as an expansion to a hotel located on Kauppiaskatu. The building had 30 hotel rooms. The inner yard hosted the Metropol film theatre, which had been built into a brick warehouse according to Strandell's plans. The theatre later functioned with the names Lyyra V and Rialto up to the 1960s.

Oy Centrum Ab sold the property to the Turku cooperative in 1942, and the cooperative planned how to make better use of the lot. The planning of the renovation started in the 1970s. Both the Finnish Museum Board and the Turku museum board wanted to protect the building. Plans for dismantling the building were published in 1976 and this drew media attention all around the country. There were differing opinions about the need to protect the building, and the intendant of the Turku Museum of Art Erik Bergh said that the building did not fit into its surroundings at all and could be dismantled.

The Turku city council accepted the dismantling plan. The Finnish People's Democratic League, the museum board, the Arts foundation for the Province of Turku and Pori and the milieu political Enemmistö ry opposed the dismantling. The Finnish state rejected the complaints about the dismantling in December 1976 and dismantling could being. Although the protection of Port Arthur had awoken citizen activism, it was Hamburger Börs that made citizens of Turku demonstrate against dismantling for the first time. Dismantling began despite of the protests, and the new hotel building was built in 1979.

The old hotel building with 14 rooms on Kauppiaskatu was spared and was reinforced in 2003. At the same time, elements in Strandell's original plans were restored to its facade and the coat of arms of Hamburg which had been on its wall since 1894 was restored. This building had originally been a two-floor stone house built in the 1830s, which had had an extra floor built and had been renovated to the Art Nouveau style from 1903 to 1904 according to Strandell's plans. The glass paintings of the building were designed by the German Willy Baer.

Gallery

Sources
 Lahtinen, Rauno: Turun puretut talot. Sammakko, 2013, Tallinn (5th edition). .

References

Demolished buildings and structures in Finland
Buildings and structures in Turku
Hotels in Finland
Buildings and structures demolished in 1976
Buildings and structures completed in 1909